My Heart Is Beating is an upcoming South Korean television series starring Ok Taec-yeon and Won Ji-an. It is scheduled for release in the first half of 2023, and will air on KBS2's Mondays and Tuesdays time slot.

Synopsis
Half-human and half-vampire Seon Woo-hyul (Ok Taec-yeon) somehow starts to live together with coldhearted woman Joo In-hae (Won Ji-an), and finds true warmth.

Cast

Main
 Ok Taec-yeon as Seon Woo-hyul: a half-human and half-vampire who has been unsuccessfully trying to become human.
 Won Ji-an as Joo In-hae: a part-time health teacher and owner of a guest house.

Supporting
 Yoon So-hee as Na Hae-won: a real estate investor.
 Park Kang-hyun as Shin Do-sik: a real estate developer.
 Ham Tae-in as Chief Goo: Do-sik's secretary.

References

External links

 

Korean-language television shows
Korean Broadcasting System television dramas
South Korean fantasy television series
South Korean romance television series
Television series by Monster Union
2023 South Korean television series debuts

Upcoming television series